
This is a list of postal codes in Canada where the first letter is L. Postal codes beginning with L are located within the Canadian province of Ontario. Only the first three characters are listed, corresponding to the Forward Sortation Area.

Canada Post provides a free postal code look-up tool on its website, via its smartphone applications for iPhone and Android, and sells hard-copy directories and CD-ROMs. Many vendors also sell validation tools, which allow customers to properly match addresses and postal codes. Hard-copy directories can also be consulted in all post offices, and some libraries.

Central Ontario - 165 FSAs

Urban

Rural (* = retired)

References

Communications in Ontario
L
Postal codes L